Domenico Montrone (born 1 May 1986) is an Italian rower. He represented his country at the 2016 Summer Olympics, where he won the bronze medal in the coxless four event. He won a silver medal at the 2017 World Rowing Championships in the coxless four.

References

External links
 
 

1986 births
Living people
Italian male rowers
Olympic rowers of Italy
Olympic medalists in rowing
Olympic bronze medalists for Italy
Rowers at the 2016 Summer Olympics
Medalists at the 2016 Summer Olympics
World Rowing Championships medalists for Italy
Rowers of Fiamme Gialle